The Best Political Documentary is one of the annual Critics' Choice Documentary Awards. It is given to the outstanding political documentary of the year.

Winners and nominees

2010s

2020s

References

Political Documentary
Awards established in 2016